Agustín Segura (born 21 March 1998) is an Argentine rugby union player, currently playing for Súper Liga Americana de Rugby side . His preferred position is centre.

Professional career
Segura signed for Súper Liga Americana de Rugby side  ahead of the 2021 Súper Liga Americana de Rugby season. He had previously represented Argentina Sevens in 2019.

References

External links
itsrugby.co.uk Profile

1998 births
Living people
Argentine rugby union players
Rugby union centres
Jaguares (Super Rugby) players
Rugby union wings
Dogos XV players